The position of Commander-in-Chief (Farmandehe Koll-e Qova, formerly known as Bozorg Arteshtārān is the ultimate authority of all the Armed Forces of Iran, and the highest possible military position within the Islamic Republic of Iran. The position was established during the Persian Constitutional Revolution. According to the Constitution of Iran, the position is vested in the Supreme Leader of Iran and is held since 1981.

List of commanders-in-chief

References

Military of Iran
Armed Forces of the Islamic Republic of Iran
Commanders in chief